Black Love is an album by saxophonist Carlos Garnett which was recorded in 1974 and released on the Muse label.

Reception

The AllMusic review by Scott Yanow called it "an interesting if not essential set" and stated "The unpredictable music overall is eccentric, sometimes overcrowded, and very much of the period but it holds one's interest".

Track listing
All compositions by Carlos Garnett
 "Black Love" – 5:31
 "Ebonesque" – 8:22
 "Banks of the Nile" – 4:15
 "Mother of the Future" – 7:40
 "Taurus Woman" – 12:37

Personnel
Carlos Garnett – tenor saxophone, alto saxophone, soprano saxophone, vocals
Charles Sullivan – trumpet
Mauricio Smith – flute
Reggie Lucas – guitar (tracks 1, 4 & 5)
Onaje Allan Gumbs – piano 
Alex Blake (tracks 1, 4 & 5), Buster Williams (tracks 2 & 3) – bass 
Jabali-Billy Hart, Norman Connors (tracks 1 & 3–5) – drums
James Mtume – congas (tracks 1 & 3–5)
Dee Dee Bridgewater (tracks 1–4), Ayodele Jenkins (tracks 1–3) – vocals

References

Muse Records albums
Carlos Garnett albums
1974 albums